Enrique López Fernández (born 24 June 1994), known as Cadete or Kadete, is a Spanish professional footballer who plays as a left back for Melbourne Victory in the Australian A-League.

Club career
Cadete was born in Madrid, and made his senior debut with Alcobendas CF in the regional leagues. In 2012 he moved to AD Alcorcón, and spent one full season in the youth setup before featuring regularly for the reserves in Tercera División.

On 18 June 2014, Cadete joined fellow fourth division side AD Unión Adarve. On 4 August of the following year, he signed for Atlético Astorga FC in Segunda División B, but left the club six days later after allegedly having discrepancies with the club's presidency.

Cadete subsequently returned to Adarve, but moved to Rayo Vallecano B in July 2016. He left the latter in early September, and rejoined Adarve for a third stint, achieving promotion to the third division at the end of the season.

On 29 May 2018, Cadete moved abroad for the first time in his career, joining Ascenso MX side Atlético San Luis. He made his professional debut on 21 July, starting in a 0–0 home draw against Mineros de Zacatecas.

Cadete scored his first professional goal on 18 August 2018, netting the opener in a 4–0 away routing of Celaya FC.

On 7 April 2021, FC Astana announced the signing of Cadete.

On 22 July 2022 Melbourne Victory announced that they had signed Lopez for the upcoming season.

Career statistics

Club

Honours
Ascenso MX (2): Apertura 2018, Clausura 2019

References

External links
 
  
 
 
 

1994 births
Living people
Footballers from Madrid
Spanish footballers
Association football defenders
Segunda División B players
Tercera División players
AD Alcorcón B players
Atlético Astorga FC players
Rayo Vallecano B players
Melbourne Victory FC players
Ascenso MX players
Atlético San Luis footballers
Spanish expatriate footballers
Spanish expatriate sportspeople in Mexico
Expatriate footballers in Mexico